Bones and Silence is a 1990 crime novel by Reginald Hill, the eleventh novel in the Dalziel and Pascoe series. The novel received the Gold Dagger Award in 1990 and was nominated for the Edgar Award.

Publication history
1990, London: Collins Crime Club , Pub date 22 March 1990, Hardback

1990 British novels
Novels by Reginald Hill
Collins Crime Club books